Percy Wilson may refer to:

 Percy Wilson (footballer) (1889–1941), Australian rules footballer 
 Percy Wilson (RAF officer) (1895–?), British World War I flying ace
 Percy Wilson (baseball) (1899–1979), American Negro leagues baseball player
 Percy Wilson (botanist) (1879–1944), American botanist
 Perce Wilson (1890–1936), American football player
 T. P. Wilson (1819–1881), Anglican priest and author